Carronia is a genus of flowering plants belonging to the family Menispermaceae. Its native range is New Guinea, northern and eastern Australia.

Species
The following species are recognised in the genus Carronia:

Carronia multisepalea 
Carronia pedicellata 
Carronia protensa 
Carronia thyrsiflora

References

Menispermaceae
Menispermaceae genera